The 2017 Asian Aerobic Gymnastics Championships were the sixth edition of the Asian Aerobic Gymnastics Championships, and were held in Ulaanbaatar, Mongolia from September 13 to 18, 2017.

Medal summary

Medal table

References

A
Asian Gymnastics Championships
2017 in Mongolian sport
International gymnastics competitions hosted by Mongolia